This is the list of the 99 members of the European Parliament for Germany in the 1994 to 1999 session.

List

Party representation

Notes

Germany
List
1994